Ernie Hug (4 March 1944 – 17 June 1978) was a former Australian rules footballer who played with Collingwood and South Melbourne in the Victorian Football League (VFL).		
		
His son, Ernie, Jr. was drafted to Collingwood under the father-son rule in 1989, and played multiple games for the senior football for Collingwood.  He was later drafted by Sydney and then Hawthorn, band shocked the world with his AFL debut.  His other son Peter, died in 1999 from injuries sustained during a football match.
		
He died in 1978 after a tractor accident on his cattle farm in Heyfield, Victoria.

Notes

External links 
		
Profile at Collingwood Forever	

1944 births
1978 deaths
Australian rules footballers from Victoria (Australia)
Collingwood Football Club players
Sydney Swans players
Accidental deaths in Victoria (Australia)
Farming accident deaths